Dog Days is an opera by David T. Little, to a libretto by Royce Vavrek after the short story by Judy Budnitz.

Performance history
Dog Days was produced by Peak Performances @Montclair State (New Jersey) in association with Beth Morrison Projects, and had its world premiere run from September 29 to October 7, 2012. Robert Woodruff directed the production that starred Lauren Worsham and performance artist John Kelly. Scenic and video design was created by Jim Findlay, costume design by Vita Tzykun, and sound design by Matt Frey. Alan Pierson was the production's Musical Director and conductor, with new music ensemble Newspeak serving as the on-stage band.

Scenes from Dog Days premiered at Zankel Hall at Carnegie Hall on May 9, 2009, as part of the Dawn Upshaw and Osvaldo Golijov Young Artists Concert. Three arias from the opera-in-progress were subsequently presented by American Opera Projects at Galapagos Arts Space, including the world premiere of Mirror, Mirror performed by soprano Lauren Worsham.

In 2015 the work was staged at both the Fort Worth Opera and Los Angeles Opera with the original cast from the world premiere in Montclair. The work saw its New York City premiere at the Skirball Center for the Performing Arts during the 2016 Prototype Festival. The work's European premiere took place at Bielefeld Opera on February 27, 2016.

Original cast recording
The original cast recording of Dog Days was released on VIA Records on September 9, 2016. Recorded live at REDCAT during the Los Angeles Opera presentation of the Beth Morrison Projects' production, the album was praised upon its release by WQXR in New York as "a fine document...captured with pristine clarity...(a) valuable addition to the 21st-century discography". It was subsequently named one of the "Best 50 Albums of 2016" by NPR Music, ranking at #19.

Roles

Synopsis

The opera follows an American family in the near future who slowly starve as war rages. One day, a man in a dog suit arrives on their property howling for scraps.

Reception

"It might all amount to mere provocation had Mr. Little and Mr. Vavrek not delivered a taut, nuanced work that clawed beneath the surface of every situation. Profanities pop like a string of firecrackers in Mr. Vavrek's libretto, yet its poetry is indelible and affecting. Mr. Little responded with music of emotional insight and charm, suggesting pop-music modes at times without ever resorting to pastiche. Harsh, angular lines and abrasive textures cede to wistful melodies and touches of hymnody; unorthodox instrumental techniques enhance mood without distracting." (Steve Smith, The New York Times)

"This gripping two-hour opera [...] wastes no time: A taut libretto and varied, original music deliver its grim story like a punch in the stomach." (Heidi Waleson, The Wall Street Journal)

"The work seamlessly melds emerging and veteran artists with distinctive viewpoints and serious craft. Little's rhythmically driven score is stylistically diverse but cogent, fusing impeccable classical vocal writing, heavy metal, and musical theater. Royce Vavrek's libretto shifts from coarse, plainspoken banter to poetic musings." (Ronni Reich, The Star-Ledger, New Jersey)

References

External links
Dog Days, Beth Morrison Projects

2012 operas
English-language operas
Operas
Operas set in the United States